Mountain cat can refer to:

 Puma concolor, also called cougar or Mountain lion
 Andean mountain cat, Leopardus jacobita
 Chinese mountain cat, Felis bieti 
 Iriomote mountain cat, Prionailurus bengalensis iriomotensis
 Ringtail, also called Ring-tailed cat or Miner's cat, Bassariscus astutus
 An alternative name for the Havana Brown domestic cat breed
 Mountain Cat, a mystery novel by Rex Stout
 Mountain Cats, a sports team from University of Pittsburgh at Johnstown
 The Wild Cat (1921 film), also called The Mountain Cat, German silent comedy film

Animal common name disambiguation pages